The Vădana is a left tributary of the river Bega in Romania. It discharges into the Bega in Făget.

References

Rivers of Romania
Rivers of Timiș County